Polonia Piła is a motorcycle speedway team based in Piła who currently race in the Polish Speedway Second League (2. Liga). They have won the Team Speedway Polish Championship once in 1999.

History

1957 to 1968
Th club started competing in the Team Speedway Polish Championship as Polonia Piła in 1957. They struggled in the lowest division until 1968, when they disbanded.

1992 to 1999
In 1992 the team returned to action competing in the second division. In 1994, they signed former world champion Hans Nielsen and won the second league and gained promotion to the highest division (the first league at the time). After their promotion the team experienced their best spell in their history/

Hans Nielsen topped the Polish averages with 2.772 in 1995 and then they won the bronze medal in the 1996 and 1997 Polish Championships followed by a silver medal in 1998. In 1999, the team finished second in the regular season table and then won the play offs to become champions of Poland for the first time. The riders that brought success to the club (in addition to Nielsen) included Rafał Dobrucki, Jacek Gollob and Jarosław Hampel.

2000 to present 
Pila were inaugural members of the Ekstraliga in 2000 and won the silver medal. Jacek Gollob won the Polish Individual Speedway Championship in 2000.

From 2003, the club experienced significant problems on and off the track. Financial issues, team promotion and management changes and quickfire relegations in 2003 and 2005 resulted in the team finding themselves in the 2. Liga (the third tier). The problems continued with the team changing their name on more than one occasion. A better season in 2011, when they won the Second League was ruined by liquidation in 2012. However, yet another new name Victoria Piła was used for the 2013 to 2015 seasons before reverting back to Polonia for the 2016 season. 

During the 2022 Polish Speedway season Polonia returned the 2. Liga but finished last.

Teams

2023 team
 Michael Palm Toft
 Artur Mroczka
 Dan Gilkes
 Daniel Henderson
 Marcin Jedrzejjewski
 Jonas Knudsen
 Piotr Gryszpinski

Previous teams

2022 team

 Matic Ivačič
 Artur Mroczka
 Marcin Jedrzejjewski
 Tomasz Orwat
 Kacper Makowski
 Marcin Ogrodnik
 Lars Skupien
 Lukas Fienhage

Notable riders

References 

Polish speedway teams
Piła County
Sport in Greater Poland Voivodeship